Stoned, Part I is the third album by the British neo-soul composer and multi-instrumentalist Lewis Taylor, released in 2002.

Track listing
Slow Reality release
"Stoned, Pt. I" (Taylor) – 4:51
"Positively Beautiful" (Taylor) – 4:24
"Lewis IV" (Sabina Smyth, Taylor) – 3:53
"Send Me an Angel" (Smyth, Taylor) – 4:36
"Til the Morning Light" (Smyth, Taylor) – 4:08
"Shame" (Smyth, Taylor) – 4:24
"When Will I Ever Learn, Pt. 1" (Smyth, Taylor) – 4:40
"Lovin' U More" (Taylor) – 4:14
"From the Day We Met, Pt. 2" (Smyth, Taylor) – 4:43
"Lovelight" (Taylor) – 4:53
"Sheneverdid" (Taylor) – 4:49

Hacktone release bonus tracks
<li>"Stop, Look, Listen (To Your Heart)" (The Stylistics)
<li>"Back Together"
<li>"Throw Me a Line"
<li>"Melt Away" (Brian Wilson)
<li>"Ghosts" (hidden track) (Japan)

References

2003 albums
Lewis Taylor albums